Mountain Transit (legally the Mountain Area Regional Transit Authority) is the third largest regional transit agency in San Bernardino County, California. Mountain Transit serves the San Bernardino Mountain communities of Crestline, Lake Arrowhead, Running Springs, and Big Bear Lake, providing local service for more than 163,000 passengers each year.

Mountain Transit also offers Off the Mountain (OTM) service that enables the residents of the mountain communities to connect with major stops in San Bernardino, which include Metrolink, Omnitrans, Greyhound, St. Bernadine's Hospital, and other stops along the way. This service runs Monday through Sunday from Big Bear, and Monday through Saturday from the RIM area. The Off the Mountain service allows mountain residents to commute to their jobs in the San Bernardino valley with three trips from Big Bear and four trips from Crestline/Lake Arrowhead weekdays. Weekend service on Mountain Transit's Big Bear OTM provides 2 round trips on Saturday and Sunday, and two round trips on Saturday from the RIM OTM (Crestline, Lake Arrowhead, and Valley of Enchantment).

Routes
Big Bear Route 1 Boulder Bay to Vons Mon-Sun.
Big Bear Route 3 Mountain Meadows to Gold Mountain Mon-Sun.
Big Bear Route 11 Erwin Lake to Vons. Mon-Sun
RIM Route 2 Valley of Enchantment to Lake Arrowhead Mon-Sat
RIM Route 4 Running Springs to Lake Arrowhead Mon-Sat.
Big Bear Valley OTM Mon-Sun
RIM OTM Mon-Sat
Big Bear Weekend Trolley
RIM Weekend Trolley

Fares
Mountain Transit offers both standard daily fares and discounted multi-trip and multi-day passes. Seniors, persons with disabilities, and veterans receive a discounted fare of 50% off. The fares also vary depending if the trip is local or off the mountain. If the fares are for Off the Mountain service, the extra fees apply.

Governance
Mountain Transit is administered by a Board of Directors, made up five members: two members of Big Bear Lake, one member at large, and two Supervisors of the County of San Bernardino.  It is required under the JPA that the Board of Directors meet at least one time each quarter of each fiscal year. Board meetings are held the third Monday of every month (except January* and February*) at 1:00 p.m. with location alternating between Big Bear Lake and Crestline.  All meetings are held in compliance with the Ralph M. Brown Act. Board meetings are presided by the Board-appointed Chair.  The Board of Directors is responsible for adopting the budget, appointing the CEO/General Manager, appointing a technical committee, establishing policy, and adopting rules and regulations for the conduct of business.

References

External links 
 Mountain Transit Website

Big Bear Valley
San Bernardino Mountains
Public transportation in San Bernardino County, California
Bus transportation in California
Transit authorities with natural gas buses
Transportation in San Bernardino, California
Transit agencies in California